The Heart Line is a 1921 American silent drama film directed by Frederick A. Thomson and starring Leah Baird, Jerome Patrick and Frederick Vroom.

Cast
 Leah Baird as Fancy Gray
 Jerome Patrick as Francis Granthope
 Frederick Vroom as Oliver Payson
 Ruth Cummings as Clytie Payson 
 Ivor McFadden as Big Dougal
 Philip Sleeman as Gay P. Summers
 Mrs. Charles Craig as Madame Spoll
 Martin Best as Blanchard Cayley
 Ben Alexander as The Child

References

Bibliography
 Goble, Alan. The Complete Index to Literary Sources in Film. Walter de Gruyter, 1999.

External links
 

1921 films
1921 drama films
1920s English-language films
American silent feature films
Silent American drama films
American black-and-white films
Pathé Exchange films
Films directed by Frederick A. Thomson
1920s American films